Carlos Alberto Santos da Silva (born May 13, 1987 in Recife), also known as Betinho, is a Brazilian footballer who current plays as a forward for Altos.

Club career
In May 2012, Betinho signs for 3 months with Palmeiras, with right to extend the contract.

Honours
Fortaleza
 Campeonato Cearense: 2010

Coritiba
 Campeonato Brasileiro Série B: 2010

Palmeiras
 Copa do Brasil: 2012

Santa Cruz
 Campeonato Pernambucano: 2015

Paysandu
 Campeonato Paraense: 2016

Cuiabá
 Copa Verde: 2016 
 Campeonato Mato-Grossense: 2017

See also
 List of Sociedade Esportiva Palmeiras players

External links
 
 
 Betinho at ZeroZero

References

1987 births
Living people
Sportspeople from Recife
Brazilian footballers
Association football forwards
Expatriate footballers in Portugal
Brazilian expatriate sportspeople in Portugal
Campeonato Brasileiro Série A players
Campeonato Brasileiro Série B players
Campeonato Brasileiro Série C players
Liga Portugal 2 players
Clube Náutico Capibaribe players
Gil Vicente F.C. players
Marília Atlético Clube players
Associação Desportiva São Caetano players
Fortaleza Esporte Clube players
Coritiba Foot Ball Club players
Vila Nova Futebol Clube players
Sociedade Esportiva Palmeiras players
Avaí FC players
Boa Esporte Clube players
Santa Cruz Futebol Clube players
Paysandu Sport Club players
Cuiabá Esporte Clube players
Agremiação Sportiva Arapiraquense players
Associação Desportiva Confiança players
Maranhão Atlético Clube players
Associação Atlética de Altos players